Miftah Ismail (born 23 July 1965) is a Pakistani political economist who served as the Federal Minister of Finance from April 2022 to September 2022. He had previously served in the same office, from April 2018 to May 2018 in Khaqan Abbasi's cabinet. Prior to that, he served as the Advisor on Finance, Revenue and Economic Affairs, chairman of the Pakistan Board of Investment and an economist with the International Monetary Fund.

Early life and career
He was born on 23 July 1965 in Karachi, Sindh. Ismail received his undergraduate degree in business from Duquesne University in 1985, followed by a Ph.D  in public finance and political economy from the Wharton School, University of Pennsylvania in 1990. Ismail worked with the International Monetary Fund as an economist based in Washington, D.C. in the early 1990s.

In 1993, he returned to Pakistan to work for his family business, Ismail Industries Limited, a confectionary and snack food manufacturer.

Political career
Ismail joined the Pakistan Muslim League (N) in 2011 and served as the head and vice-chairman of Punjab Board of Investment and Trade from 2012 to 2013.

During the 2013 Pakistani general election, Ismail served as a member of the election strategy team and the manifesto committee of Pakistan Muslim League (N). In October 2013, Ismail became a member of the Board of Directors of Pakistan International Airlines. In November 2013, he joined the Board of Directors of Sui Southern Gas Company. Both of these positions he retained until 4 January 2014, when he was appointed as the head of Federal Board of Investment and was added as a junior member of then Prime Minister Sharif's cabinet. Under his leadership the Board of Investment underwent massive restructuring including winding up of its regional offices. During his tenure at the Board of Investment, the government of Pakistan formulated a new automobile sector policy that has attracted a lot of new investment in the automobile sector.

Ismail has served as adjunct faculty at the Institute of Business Administration and also as chairman of board at Karachi American School.

After being appointed as one of the key finance advisers to the Prime Minister Shahid Khaqan Abbasi in December 2017, he stated that one of his top priorities is to help broaden the extremely narrow tax base in Pakistan which would strengthen the overall economy. He said that he would help design an economic policy that gives opportunity to the wealthy Pakistanis abroad to bring back their wealth. In other words, the government was ready to initiate an 'offshore tax amnesty scheme' soon.

On 27 April 2018, Ismail took oath as Federal Minister for Finance, Revenue and Economic Affairs in Shahid Khaqan Abbasi's cabinet, where he served until 31 May 2018.

He took oath as Finance minister again on 19 April 2022 and resigned on 27 September 2022 to pave way for Ishaq Dar.

Other activities
 Asian Infrastructure Investment Bank (AIIB), Ex-Officio Member of the Board of Governors (since 2017)
 World Bank, Ex-Officio Member of the Board of Governors (since 2017).

References 

Living people
Duquesne University alumni
Wharton School of the University of Pennsylvania alumni
Nawaz Sharif administration
Pakistani economists
Pakistani business executives
Pakistani prisoners and detainees
Pakistan Muslim League (N) politicians
Finance Ministers of Pakistan
Pakistani people of Gujarati descent
1965 births